Victor M. Morales (born November 15, 1949) is an American teacher who was the Democratic Party's nominee for the 1996 United States Senate election in Texas in 1996. Morales was a 46-year-old Vietnam War veteran and civics teacher at Poteet High School in Mesquite, Texas when his students dared him to run for Senate and he did.

Early life and education
Morales was born November 15, 1949, in Racine, Wisconsin. He was in the navy 1970-72 and served in the Philippines and Vietnam during the Vietnam War. He graduated from Texas A&I University in 1976. He was a city council member in Crandall, Texas. He danced competitively.

Political career
Morales, who had never run for public office before, pulled a major upset in the primary by defeating three politicians: U.S. Congressman John Wiley Bryant, U.S. Congressman Jim Chapman, and former State Supreme Court litigator John Odam. He campaigned around the state in his pickup truck. His campaign slogan was "Porque no? or "Why Not?" His only previous political experience was a two-year term on the City Council of his hometown of Crandall, Texas. In the March run-off, he defeated Bryant with 51% of the vote. He became the first minority candidate in Texas history to become a United States Senate nominee from either major party. Despite having no staff, raising only $15,000, and not accepting any special interest money he obtained 2.5 million votes.

Exit polls showed that Morales won African Americans' votes (79% to 19%) and Latinos (79% to 20%) respectively. Though Morales lost, his effort was an important moment for the Hispanic community. "It's just rejuvenated the community, paving the way for future candidates ... there's a lot of excitement because of what he was able to do."

See also
1996 United States Senate election in Texas
Cristina Tzintzún Ramirez - Latina candidate for U.S. Senate in Texas in 2020

References

External links
Annie "Mamá" Garcia - Insurgent candidate for U.S. Senate in Texas in 2020 described by the Texas Tribune as "one fed-up mama"

1949 births
Candidates in the 1996 United States elections
Hispanic and Latino American politicians
People from Kaufman County, Texas
United States Navy personnel of the Vietnam War
United States Navy sailors
Texas A&I University alumni
Living people